This is a list of electoral results for the electoral district of Korong in Victorian state elections.

Members for Korong

Election results

Elections in the 1950s

Elections in the 1940s

Elections in the 1920s

Elections in the 1910s

References

Victoria (Australia) state electoral results by district